The Verapaz shrew (Sorex veraepacis) is a species of mammal in the family Soricidae. It is found in Guatemala and Mexico.

References

Sorex
Mammals of Central America
Mammals of Mexico
Taxonomy articles created by Polbot
Mammals described in 1877